A by-election for the seat of Fisher in the South Australian House of Assembly was held on 6 December 2014. The by-election was triggered by the death of independent MP Bob Such on 11 October 2014. Originally elected to Fisher for the Liberal Party of Australia at the 1989 election, defeating the one-term Australian Labor Party MP Philip Tyler, Such left the party in 2000.

Though the Liberals were favourites to win the traditionally Liberal seat, Labor's Nat Cook won the by-election by five votes, a 50.02 percent two-party-preferred vote from a 7.27-point swing away from the Liberals, resulting in a change from minority to majority government. Despite this, the Jay Weatherill Labor government kept crossbench MPs Geoff Brock and Martin Hamilton-Smith in cabinet, giving the government a 26 to 21 parliamentary majority.

ABC psephologist Antony Green described the by-election as a "very poor result for the Liberal Party in South Australia both state and federally", and that a fourth term government gaining a seat at a by-election was unprecedented in Australian history. Much of the anti-Liberal swing was attributed to the unpopularity of then Prime Minister Tony Abbott, and additionally, the remark from then Defence Minister David Johnston several days before the Fisher by-election, where he stated he wouldn't trust South Australia's Australian Submarine Corporation to "build a canoe".

Dates

Candidates

Two-party-preferred history

The two-party-preferred vote in Fisher while Such was an independent:

Polling
One opinion poll was conducted and released by the in-house polling group at The Advertiser, Adelaide's main newspaper. Between one and two weeks prior to the by-election, 400 voters were polled in the seat. Voters were randomly selected at the sole pre-poll booth at Happy Valley Shopping Centre, as well as at Aberfoyle Hub. Primary votes saw 34.25 (−0.85) percent to Liberal, 30 percent to Woodyatt, 20.5 (+2.8) percent to Labor, with a collective 15 percent for the remaining five candidates. The Advertiser claimed that a Liberal primary vote below 40 percent and the high vote for Woodyatt with Labor remaining in third place, preferences could have seen Fisher retained by an independent, Woodyatt.

South Australian Newspoll at the time of the by-election recorded a statewide six percent two-party swing from Liberal to Labor.

Result

Though the Liberals were favourites to win the traditionally Liberal seat, Labor's Nat Cook won the by-election by five votes with Woodyatt preferences, a 50.02 percent two-party-preferred vote from a 7.27 percent swing away from the Liberals, resulting in a change from minority to majority government. Despite this, the Jay Weatherill Labor government kept crossbench MPs Geoff Brock and Martin Hamilton-Smith in cabinet, giving the government a 26 to 21 parliamentary majority. The Liberals were successful in requesting a re-count which occurred on 15 December.

Labor achieved majority government at a state level one week prior at the 2014 Victorian election.

ABC psephologist Antony Green described the by-election as a "very poor result for the Liberal Party in South Australia both state and federally", and that a fourth term government gaining a seat at a by-election was unprecedented in Australian history. Much of the anti-Liberal swing was attributed to the unpopularity of then Prime Minister Tony Abbott, and additionally, the remark from then Defence Minister David Johnston several days before the by-election, where he stated he wouldn't trust South Australia's Australian Submarine Corporation to "build a canoe".

Former Liberal leader Iain Evans in Davenport resigned from parliament on 30 October 2014 which triggered a 2015 Davenport by-election for 31 January. Just a couple of days before the Davenport by-election, Abbott's infamous knighting of Prince Philip occurred. Liberal Sam Duluk won the seat despite a five percent two-party swing, turning the historically safe seat of Davenport in to a two-party marginal seat for the first time. ABC psephologist Antony Green described it as "another poor result for the South Australian Liberal Party".

See also
2015 Davenport state by-election
2018 South Australian state election#Polling
List of South Australian House of Assembly by-elections

References

External links
2014 Fisher By-election: Antony Green ABC
2014 Fisher by-election: ECSA
How-To-Vote (HTV) cards, 2014 Fisher By-election: ECSA

2014 elections in Australia
South Australian state by-elections
2010s in South Australia